The discography of American hip hop recording artist J Dilla, consists of nine studio albums and eight extended plays.

Albums

Studio albums

Posthumous albums

Extended plays

Posthumous extended plays

Guest appearances

Instrumentation and technical credits

See also 
 Love for Sale (Bilal album), an unreleased album by Bilal, for which J Dilla assisted in producing

References 

Hip hop discographies
Production discographies
Discography
Discographies of American artists